Griseargiolestes bucki is a species of Australian damselfly in the family Megapodagrionidae,
commonly known as a turquoise flatwing. 
It is endemic to the Barrington Tops area of New South Wales, where it inhabits streams, bogs and seepages.

G. bucki is a medium-sized damselfly, black-green metallic in colour with pale markings, and slightly pruinescent.
Like other members of the family Megapodagrionidae it rests with its wings outspread.

G. bucki appears similar to Griseargiolestes albescens, which is found in coastal areas of north-eastern New South Wales and south-eastern Queensland.

Gallery

See also 
 List of Odonata species of Australia

References 

Megapodagrionidae
Odonata of Australia
Insects of Australia
Endemic fauna of Australia
Taxa named by Günther Theischinger
Insects described in 1998
Damselflies